John Howard Cruse (known as Howard; 15 February 1908 – 11 April 1979) was Bishop of Knaresborough from 1965 to 1972.

Cruse was educated at Jesus College, Cambridge and studied for ordination at Wycliffe Hall, Oxford  before curacies at Southall and Folkestone. From 1936 until 1949 he held incumbencies at Harrow and Cambridge, followed by a 16-year stint as  Provost of Sheffield.  In 1965 he was appointed Suffragan Bishop of Knaresborough where he remained until his retirement. He married twice: firstly in 1942 Ethne Sterling-Berry; and after her death in 1977 Violet Briscoe.

References

 

Alumni of Jesus College, Cambridge
Provosts and Deans of Sheffield
Bishops of Knaresborough
1908 births
1979 deaths